Mujibur Rahman Bangladesh Nationalist Party politician. He was elected a member of parliament from Dinajpur-2 in February 1996.

Career 
Mujibur was elected to parliament from Dinajpur-2 as a Bangladesh Nationalist Party candidate in 15 February 1996 Bangladeshi general election.

References 

Possibly living people
Year of birth missing (living people)
People from Dinajpur District, Bangladesh
Bangladesh Nationalist Party politicians
6th Jatiya Sangsad members